Sohland is the name of two municipalities in Saxony:

 Sohland am Rotstein, Niederschlesischer Oberlausitzkreis
 Sohland an der Spree, Landkreis Bautzen